Baldissera is an Italian surname. Notable people with the surname include:

Antonio Baldissera (1838–1917), Italian general
Barbara Baldissera (born 1978), Italian short track speed skater

See also
Castellini Baldissera Italian family

Italian-language surnames